Nito Alves (1945–1977) was an Angolan politician who served as the interior minister of Angola from independence, on November 11, 1975, until President Agostinho Neto abolished the position in October 1976. A hardline member of the People's Movement for the Liberation of Angola (MPLA), Alves is best known for his failed 1977 coup attempt against Neto.

Alves supported fractionism, opposing Neto's foreign policy of nonalignment, evolutionary socialism, and multiracialism. Alves favored stronger relations with the Soviet Union, which he wanted to grant military bases in Angola. He represented the MPLA at the 25th Congress of the Communist Party of the Soviet Union in February 1976.

On May 21, 1977, the MPLA expelled him from the party. He and his supporters broke into a prison, freeing other supporters, and took control of the radio station in Luanda in an attempted coup. Forces loyal to Neto took back the radio and arrested those involved in the coup attempt. While Cuban soldiers actively helped Neto put down the coup, Alves claimed that the Soviet Union supported the coup. British mercenaries in prison in Luanda refused to become involved.

Alves's power base was centered on Malanje. After the failed coup the MPLA undertook a purge designed to eliminate factionalism and killed thousands, including Alves.

References

External links
 Alves biography at 27maio.com

1945 births
1977 deaths
Interior ministers of Angola
MPLA politicians